The Ten Great Merchant Guilds were the variously influential groups of merchants and businessmen in Chinese history. They were:

 Shanxi Merchants (晉商) - also known as Jin merchants
 Huizhou Merchants -  based in modern Huangshan, Anhui
 Longyou Merchants (龍游商幫) - based in modern western Zhejiang province
 Ningbo Merchants (寧波商幫)
 Dongting Merchants 洞庭商幫 - based in the Dongting region of modern Suzhou
 Jiangxi Merchants (江西商幫) - also known as the Jiangyou Merchants (江右商幫)
 Guangdong Merchants 
 Shaanxi Merchants 
 Shandong Merchants
 Fujian (Min) Merchants

See also
 Hong (business)
 Cohong

References

Guilds